The men's 400 metres hurdles event at the 2010 Asian Games was held at the Aoti Main Stadium, Guangzhou, China on 24–25 November.

Schedule
All times are China Standard Time (UTC+08:00)

Records

Results
Legend
DNF — Did not finish
DNS — Did not start
DSQ — Disqualified

Round 1
 Qualification: First 3 in each heat (Q) and the next 2 fastest (q) advance to the final.

Heat 1

Heat 2

Final

References
Results

Athletics at the 2010 Asian Games
2010